Like a Child may refer to:

 "Like a Child" (Jars of Clay song), 1995
 "Like a Child" (Noel song), 1988